Kentucky Gold (foaled 14 February 1973) was a Thoroughbred racehorse who was sold for a world-record $625,000 ($ million inflation adjusted) in 1974. As a racehorse, he won one minor race from seven starts. He was then retired to stud and sired the winners of many minor races.

Background
Kentucky Gold was a bay horse bred in Kentucky by Leslie Combs II of Spendhrift Farm. Having been sired by Raise A Native out of the mare Gold Digger he was a full-brother to Mr. Prospector.

At the Keeneland Sales in July 1974 the yearling was sold for a then world-recond price of $625,000, with Mr & Mrs W Gilroy of Chicago winning the auction. He broke the record set a year earlier by  Wajima. He was the fifth Spendthrift graduate to hold the record following One Bold Bid, Bold Discovery, Majestic Prince and Crowned Prince.

Racing career
Kentucky Gold was sent into training with Richard J. Fischer. His racing career consisted of seven starts as a three-year-old in 1976. After finishing third at Hollywood Park Racetrack on his debut in a maiden race in April he finished unplaced in two similar events at the same track before winning a maiden at Delaware Park on August 15. He then finished fourth at Keystone Park and finished third in two allowance races at Keeneland in October.

Stud record
Kentucky Gold was retired from racing to become a breeding stallion. He was not particularly successful, but did sire some prolific winners of minor races in North America including Golden Tumiga (twenty-six wins), Native of Kentucky (twenty-one wins), Golden Occasion (thirteen wins) and Fort Worth (thirteen wins). Kentucky Gold died in 2001.

Pedigree

References

1973 racehorse births
2001 racehorse deaths
Racehorses bred in Kentucky
Racehorses trained in the United States
Thoroughbred family 13-c